Agim Canaj (born 14 July 1962) is an Albanian football coach and former international player. As of March 2019, he is coaching Vllaznia Shkodër.

Club career
As a player, he played with Dinamo Tirana in the European Cup Winners' Cup 1989–90. A soon as Albanians were free to leave the country after the end of the communist era, Canaj moved abroad to play alongside compatriot Arbën Minga in Romania for FC Brașov.

International career
Canaj made his debut for Albania in a March 1991 UEFA Euro 1992 qualification match against France, which remained his only cap.

Managerial career
As a manager, he led Vllaznia Shkodër into the 2nd qualifying round of UEFA Cup 2008–09, losing to S.S.C. Napoli. In summer 2015 he was named coach of Bylis Ballsh for the third time.

Honours
Albanian Superliga: 2
 1986, 1990

Albanian Cup: 2 
 2003, 2008

References

External links

1962 births
Living people
Association football defenders
Albanian footballers
Albania international footballers
FK Dinamo Tirana players
FC Brașov (1936) players
Liga I players
Albanian expatriate footballers
Expatriate footballers in Romania
Albanian expatriate sportspeople in Romania
Albanian football managers
FK Dinamo Tirana managers
KS Lushnja managers
Shkumbini Peqin managers
Besa Kavajë managers
KF Skënderbeu Korçë managers
Flamurtari Vlorë managers
KF Vllaznia Shkodër managers
KF Bylis Ballsh managers
FK Kukësi managers
KF Tërbuni Pukë managers
Kategoria Superiore players
Kategoria Superiore managers